Ulmus minor subsp. canescens is a small deciduous tree occasionally known by the common names grey elm, grey-leafed elm, and hoary elm. Its natural range extends through the lands of the central and eastern Mediterranean, from southern Italy, the islands of Sicily, Malta, Crete, Rhodes and Cyprus, to Turkey, and as far south as Israel, where it is now considered rare and endangered in the wild. The tree is typically found amidst the comparatively humid coastal woodlands and scrublands.

Taxonomy
The taxonomy of the tree remains a matter of contention; Melville originally treated the tree as a species in its own right, U. canescens, while others, notably Richens, and Browicz & Ziel., sank it as a subspecies of Ulmus minor.

Description
The tree is comparatively small, < 20 m high; the slender trunk, its bark coarsely fissured, supporting a rounded crown. The leaves are elliptic to ovate, bluntly toothed, and densely downy on the underside when mature, imbuing them with a distinctive greyish hue. The young shoots also have a whitish-grey down. The tree flowers in February and March, the round samarae, < 15 mm diameter, deeply notched at the outer end, ripen in April.

Pests and diseases
Ulmus minor subsp. canescens is highly susceptible to Dutch elm disease.

Cultivation
Ulmus minor subsp. canescens is occasionally planted as a street tree in Israel, notably in Jerusalem near the Damascus Gate along the Prophets Road and Antal Ben Shaddad street. In Nazareth, a line of mature trees is found along the road leading to the Basilica. It is also planted in Jordan, especially Amman.  There are no known cultivars of this taxon, nor is it known to be in commerce.

Accessions
North America
Morton Arboretum, US. Acc. no. 395-76
Europe
Akamas Botanical Garden, Cyprus. Acc. details not known.
Grange Farm Arboretum, Sutton St James, Spalding, Lincs., UK. Acc. no. 826.
Royal Botanic Garden Edinburgh, UK. Labelled Ulmus canescens. Acc. no. 20090690. From seed wild collected in Israel.
Sir Harold Hillier Gardens, Romsey, UK. Acc. no. 2009.0334. From seed wild collected in Israel.

References

External links
 Euforgen: elms.
 

  Sheet labelled Ulmus canescens Melville; specimen from Phaselis
 Sheet labelled U. minor Mill. subsp. canescens Melville; specimen from Adana, 1959

minor subsp. canescens
Trees of Europe
Trees of Mediterranean climate
Flora of Israel
Flora of Palestine (region)
Flora of Greece
Trees of Asia
Flora of Crete
Flora of Sicily
Flora of Cyprus
Vulnerable plants
Ulmus articles with images
Controversial elm taxa